The steel industry in China has been driven by rapid modernisation of its economy, construction, infrastructure and manufacturing industries.

History

20th century

The steel industry was small and sparsely populated at the start of the twentieth century and during both world wars. China lagged behind the western countries in its steel industry development even though they were using central planning techniques during the early days of communist rule.

China underwent rapid economic industrialisation since Deng Xiaoping's capitalist reforms which took place in 1978.

The steel industry gradually increased its output. China's annual crude steel output was 100 million tons in 1996.

21st century
After ascension to the WTO China aggressively expanded production for export and the growing appetite of local manufacturing industries such as automotive vehicles, consumer electronics and building materials.

The Chinese steel industry is dominated by a number of large state-owned groups which are owned via shareholdings by local authorities, provincial governments and even the central authorities. According to China Iron and Steel Association, The top 5 steel groups by production volume in 2015 are Baosteel Group–Wuhan Iron and Steel Corporation, Hesteel Group, Shagang Group, Ansteel Group and Shougang Group.

By 2008 raw materials such as Iron ore prices grew and China had to reluctantly agree to price increases by the three largest iron ore producers in the world; BHP, Rio Tinto and Vale. During the Global financial crisis the Chinese steel mills won price reprieves as demand from their customers slowed. When the demand started to pick up again in 2009 and in 2010, the price crept back up due to higher demand for automobiles, low interest rates, government fiscal stimuli around the world. Prices for iron ore were negotiated on an annual contract pricing scheme.
 Australian iron ore producers were not happy that iron prices did not reflect Spot market pricing. In 2010 pressure from BHP and Rio Tinto to move to a quarterly based index pricing succeeded. Many Japanese steel mills and Chinese steel companies had to follow as demand for raw materials heated up. Spot-basis pricing has caused problems for steel manufacturers such as exposing them to price fluctuation in the market and reducing the stability of resource supply. Steel mills prefer long term pricing to hedge against cost and maintain raw material supply stability. Rio Tinto has said it will cancel contracts and sell the steel on the spot markets if Chinese steel mills back down on the new quarterly pricing regime.

In 2011 China was the largest producer of steel in the world producing 45% of the world's steel, 683 million tons, an increase of 9% from 2010. 6 of 10 of largest steel producers in the world are in China. Profits are low despite continued high demand due to high debt and overproduction of high end products produced with the equipment financed by the high debt. The central government is aware of this problem but there is no easy way to resolve it as local governments strongly support local steel production. Meanwhile, each firm aggressively increases production. Iron ore production kept pace with steel production in the early 1990s but was soon outpaced by imported iron ore and other metals in the early 2000s. Steel production, an estimated 140 million tons in 2000 increased to 419 million tons in 2006. Much of the country's steel output comes from a large number of small-scale producing centers, one of the largest being Anshan in Liaoning.

China was the top exporter of steel in the world in 2008. Export volumes in 2008 were 59.23 million tons, a 5.5% fall over the previous year. The decline ended China's decade-old steel export growth. As of 2012 steel exports faced widespread anti-dumping taxes and had not returned to pre-2008 levels. Domestic demand remained strong, particularly in the developing west where steel production in Xinjiang was expanding.

On 26 April 2012 a warning was issued by China's bank regulator to use caution with respect to lending money to steel companies who, as profits from the manufacture and sale of steel have fallen, have sometimes used borrowed money for speculative purposes. According to the China Iron and Steel Association the Chinese steel industry lost 1 billion Rmb in the first quarter of 2012, its first loss since 2000.

As of 2015 the global steel market was weak with both Ukraine and Russia attempting to export large amounts of steel. Weak domestic demand in 2014 resulted in record exports of 100 million metric tons of steel by the Chinese steel industry.

Efforts by the Chinese Ministry of Environmental Protection under the Action Plan for the Prevention and Control of Air Pollution has resulted in pressure on steel mills in Linyi and Chengde to employ environmental protection measures on pain of being closed down.

In the context of lowered demand (see also 2015–16 Chinese stock market crash), in 2016 the Chinese state announced large scale closures and redundancies in heavy and primary industries, many of which were functioning as zombie companies, with  1.8 million redundancies (15% of workforce) in the coal and steel industries planned to take place by 2020.

See also
China Iron and Steel Association
History of the steel industry (1850–1970)
History of the steel industry (1970–present)
List of countries by steel production
List of steel producers
Steel mill

References

External links

Industry in China
Steel industry of China